Common Property is a 1919 American silent drama film directed by William C. Dowlan and Paul Powell and starring Robert Anderson, Nell Craig and Colleen Moore.

Cast
 Robert Anderson as Paval Pavlovitch
 Nell Craig as Anna Pavlovitch
 Colleen Moore as Tatyone
 John Cook as Stepan 
 Frank Leigh as Ivan Ivaoff 
 Arthur Jasmine as Lyof
 Richard Cummings as Father Alexyei 
 Robert Lawler as Vaska
 Arthur Maude as Nikolai

References

Bibliography
 Codori, Jeff. Colleen Moore: A Biography of the Silent Film Star. McFarland, 2012.

External links
 

1919 films
1919 drama films
1910s English-language films
American silent feature films
Silent American drama films
American black-and-white films
Films directed by Paul Powell (director)
Films directed by William C. Dowlan
Universal Pictures films
1910s American films